The Very Best of Era is a collection of songs from previous albums and remixes by Era.

Track listing 
 "Ameno" (remix) – 3:49
 "Don't Go Away" – 4:24
 "The Mass" – 3:42
 "Mother" (remix) – 4:11
 "Misere Mani" – 4:06
 "Avemano Orchestral" – 4:21
 "Looking for Something" – 4:10
 "Don't U" – 2:58
 "Enae Volare" – 3:36
 "Cathar Rhythm" – 3:20
 "Divano" – 3:55
 "Don't You Forget" – 3:42
 "Hymne" – 4:56
 "Sentence" – 4:53
 "I Believe" – 4:25
 "Looking for Something" (Darren Tate mix edit) – 3:19

Premium Video Edition 
A "Premium" version was also released at the same time which includes a Video DVD. The back cover reads "The Complete Era video collection including all Era music videos and special features."

Music videos include:
1. Misere Mani  2. Mother  3. The Mass  4. Looking For Something  5. Ameno  6. Infanati  7. Enae Volare Mezzo  8. Divano  9. Looking For Something Remix

Charts

Year-end charts

Year-end charts

Certifications

References

External links
 https://web.archive.org/web/20050529000734/http://era-music.artistes.universalmusic.fr/

Era (musical project) albums
2008 greatest hits albums